Kasam is a 1988 Bollywood action film directed by Umesh Mehra starring Anil Kapoor, Poonam Dhillon in the lead roles. The film has musical score by Bappi Lahiri.

Synopsis 
Inspector Krishna goes undercover to a village so as to infiltrate a drug ring. However, a precarious dacoit who cultivates poppy manages to trap Krishna in a criminal case and throw him behind the bars. Years later, Krishna, upon being freed, pledges to seek vengeance from those who betrayed him.

Cast 

 Anil Kapoor as Inspector Kishan Kumar / Krishna
 Poonam Dhillon as Savi
 Kader Khan as Nathu
 Aruna Irani as Gulabo
 Gulshan Grover as Jinda
 Pran as Sardar Mangal Singh
 Satyen Kappu as Police Commissioner Anand Sareen
 Sudhir Dalvi as Inspector General of Police 
 Amrit Pal as Dharia
 Puneet Issar as Dharia's Henchman
 Adi Irani as Inspector Arun
 Roopesh Kumar as Police Inspector 
 Shammi as Bua
 Johnny Lever as Buddhu
 Guddi Maruti as Buddhu's Wife 
 Ketki Dave as Padma
 Viju Khote as South Indian Smuggler
 Anirudh Agarwal as Jinda's Henchman

Soundtrack

References

External links 
 

1980s Hindi-language films
1980s action drama films
1988 films
Indian Western (genre) films
1988 Western (genre) films
Films scored by Bappi Lahiri
Films directed by Umesh Mehra
Indian action drama films
Indian films about revenge